Chameau (French for "camel") may refer to:

Jean-Lou Chameau (born 1953), civil engineer and president of the California Institute of Technology
French ship Chameau, a sailing ship that sank in 1725
Chameau, les Saintes, a mountain on Terre-de-Haut Island in the Caribbean Sea
Chameau Island, near Antarctica
Le Chameau, a mountain on Koh Rong Sanloem, a Cambodian island
Chameau, a method of reducing a ship's draught with flotation tanks - see Gun port